Koçtepe is a village in the Güçlükonak District of Şırnak Province in Turkey. The settlement is populated by Kurds of the Şikakî tribe and had a population of 757 in 2021.

The hamet of Koçyurdu is attached to Koçtepe.

References 

Villages in Güçlükonak District
Kurdish settlements in Şırnak Province